The National Museum of Ratnapura is one of the national museums of Sri Lanka. It is located in Ratnapura, Sri Lanka and it was opened on 13 May 1988. The museum building is called “Ehelepola Walauwa”, as it once belonged to Ehelepola Nilame, a courtier of the Kingdom of Kandy, who was the 1st Adigar (1811 - 1814) under the reign King Sri Vikrama Rajasinha, the last king of Sri Lanka, for whom he served as the Disawe (local Governor) of Ratnapura.

The museum includes exhibits on prehistoric archaeological inventions, natural heritage, geological, anthropological, zoological artifacts and models relating to the Sabaragamuwa Province. The weaponry on display include Sinhala swords of the late medieval era including a sword alleged to have belonged to Ehelepola, and a collection of old guns including a Vickers machine gun used during the First World War. The cooking utensils of the region include a tripod pan with three moulds for preparing rice flour cakes known as kiri roti. Traditional Kandyan jewellery includes necklaces, bangles, anklets and earrings. The grounds of the museum contain a palaeobiodiversity park, with life-sized animal sculptures of species believed to have existed in the region.

See also

List of museums in Sri Lanka

References

External links
Image Gallery : Ratnapura National Museum
Government Information Centre

Museums in Ratnapura District
Sri Lanka
Archaeological protected monuments in Ratnapura District
History museums in Sri Lanka